Charles I of Zweibrücken-Birkenfeld (4 September 1560 – 16 December 1600), Count Palatine of the Rhine, Duke in Bavaria, Count to Veldenz and Sponheim was the Duke of Zweibrücken-Birkenfeld from 1569 until 1600.

Life
Charles was born in Neuburg in 1560 as the youngest son of Wolfgang, Count Palatine of Zweibrücken. After his father's death in 1569, Charles and his brothers partitioned his territories: Charles received the Palatine share on the Rear County of Sponheim, a small territory around Birkenfeld. Charles is the founder of the House of Palatinate-Birkenfeld.

Charles died in Birkenfeld in 1600 and was buried in Meisenheim. Charles was a prince of a relatively unimportant state, and his chief fame is that the Kings of Bavaria descended from him.

Marriage
Charles married Dorothea of Brunswick-Lüneburg (1 January 1570 – 15 August 1649), daughter of Duke William VI, on 23 February 1590 and had the following children:
George William (6 August 1591 – 25 December 1669)
Sophie (29 March 1593 – 16 November 1676), married to Crato VII of Hohenlohe-Neuenstein (14 November 1582 – 11 October 1641)
Frederick (29 October 1594 – 20 July 1626)
Christian (3 November 1598 – 6 September 1654)

Ancestors

References 
 Jahresbericht [afterw.] Trierer Jahresberichte, 1858, p. 50 (Digitalised)

1560 births
1600 deaths
House of Wittelsbach
Counts Palatine of Zweibrücken